Wilbur Henry Durborough (October 11, 1882 – April 4, 1946) was a photojournalist and film correspondent who covered World War I with the German army.

Biography

Photojournalist and film correspondent Wilbur Henry Durborough was born on October 11, 1882, in Rising Sun, Kent County, Delaware. After trying a number of different occupations, he decided to try photography, and was hired by the Philadelphia Inquirer in 1909.  He then worked for Hearst's Chicago Examiner and in 1912 covered all three political conventions: the Republican Convention, the Democratic Convention, and the Bull Moose Convention.  In 1913, he became a photographer for the Newspaper Enterprise Association (NEA), and it was at the NEA that he really hit his stride. Shortly before the outbreak of World War I Durborough covered the Mexican War and it was during this conflict that he probably had his first experience cranking a movie camera while covering the attack of Vera Cruz by U.S. Marines, together with Chicago Tribune cameraman Edwin F. Weigle.

Sometime in early 1915, Durborough proposed to a group of Chicago businessmen that he make a trip to Germany to cover the Great War.  His plan was to do still photography, but also to make a film about the trip, showing the war to Americans first hand.  He was not an experienced cinematographer, so he needed one to accompany him. Berlin approved his trip and together with his camera operator Irving Guy Ries he sailed for Europe. In wartime Berlin, Durborough and Ries filmed a notable Chicagoan, Jane Addams, along with Aletta Jacobs and Alice Hamilton, who were in Germany as part of the Women's Peace Movement. The three women had been traveling to all the capitols in Europe, trying in vain to persuade the responsible leaders in the various warring countries to make peace. This film scene has the only extant footage of Dutch suffragette Aletta Jacobs.

In the summer of 1915, the American reporters went to East Prussia where they filmed the results of the Russian invasions of 1914. On their way to the Eastern Front, Durborough also filmed Field Marshal Paul von Hindenburg and Kaiser Wilhelm II. They accompanied the German army during the drive through Russian Poland and covered the fall of Warsaw and the forts of Novo Georgievsk.

After the war Durborough worked in public relations and he had his own photographic agency. He died in San Bernardino, California, on April 4, 1946, at the age of 63. Shortly before his death, Durborough started writing his memoirs on his experiences as a war photographer. The original manuscript is now in the collection of the Library of Congress.

Film work

On the Firing Line with the Germans has been restored by the Library of Congress in 2015, based on research by film historians James W. Castellan, Cooper C. Graham and Ron van Dopperen. It is the only contemporary American film documentary of World War I that has survived almost complete. The film is now in the public domain and can be watched online, almost exactly as it was first shown on the American screen in the fall of 1915. The digitally restored version of this World War I film premiered at the Pordenone Silent Film Festival in Italy in October 2015.

Sources 

 Kevin Brownlow, The War, the West and the Wilderness (London/New York 1979)
 Cooper C. Graham, "The Kaiser and the Cameraman: W.H. Durborough on the Eastern Front" Film History 1 (2010), 22–40, https://muse.jhu.edu/article/376112
 James W. Castellan, "Wilbur H. Durborough's Lost and Future 1915 World War I Documentary Film", Journal of Film Preservation (April 2015), 45-51
 James W. Castellan, Ron van Dopperen, Cooper C. Graham, American Cinematographers in the Great War, 1914-1918 (New Barnet, 2014) https://doi.org/10.2307%2Fj.ctt1bmzn8c
 James W. Castellan, Ron van Dopperen, Cooper C. Graham, On the Firing Line with the Germans Film Annotations: The Making of Wilbur H. Durborough's World War I Movie (2nd edition 2017)

Films and pictures 

 "On the Firing Line with the Germans" (USA, 1915) - restored by the Library of Congress in 2015
 Reel America: "On the Firing Line with the Germans", with commentary by Cooper C. Graham and James W. Castellan, broadcast by C SPAN3, 2017
 Wilbur H. Durborough - Collection of Film Frames and Pictures from "On the Firing Line with the Germans" (1915)
 "The Western Spirit" (USA, 1918) - propaganda film by Wilbur Durborough for the U.S. Signal Corps, reconstructed in 2017
 Movie Trailer "American Cinematographers in the Great War, 1914-1918"

References 

1882 births
1946 deaths
War photography
American war photographers
War correspondents of World War I
20th-century American photographers
Photographers from Delaware
People from Kent County, Delaware
World War I photographers
American photojournalists